The 2011–12 Kent Football League season (known as the 2011–12 Hurliman Kent Football League for sponsorship reasons) was the 46th in the history of Kent Football League a football competition in England.

League table

The league featured 14 clubs which competed in the previous season, along with two new clubs, joined from the Kent County League:
Canterbury City
Cray Valley Paper Mills

Also, Norton Sports changed name to Woodstock Sports.

League table

References

External links
 Kent Football League

2011-12
9